Jordan Cairnie (born 26 May 1996) is a Scottish professional footballer who plays as a defender or a striker who last played for Ardrossan Winton Rovers.

Now number 1 darts player in Ayrshire, sponsored by Highland meats

Career
Cairnie, who attended Ardrossan Academy, made his debut for Greenock Morton in the Scottish Championship on 29 March 2014, in a defeat against Queen of the South. In May 2014 he signed a two-year full-time contract with the club, keeping him at Cappielow until 2016.

Cairnie had a spell on loan with Ardrossan Winton Rovers, who he previously played with at youth level. With the club, Cairnie scored two goals, helping them to win the Ayrshire District League.

In October 2015, Cairnie moved on loan to Scottish League Two side East Stirlingshire until 6 January 2016. He made his Shire debut in a home victory over Elgin City and scored his first senior goal in a 3–1 win over Montrose at Ochilview.

Cairnie was released by Morton at the end of April 2016, and signed for Ayrshire Junior side Kilwinning Rangers. He quickly moved on to Ardrossan Winton Rovers for the third time, when ex-Morton coach Sandy MacLean took over as manager.

Honours
Ardrossan Winton Rovers
SJFA West Region – Ayrshire District League: 2014–15

Morton
SPFL Development League West: Winners 2015-16

References

External links

1996 births
Living people
Footballers from Irvine, North Ayrshire
Greenock Morton F.C. players
East Stirlingshire F.C. players
Kilwinning Rangers F.C. players
Ardrossan Winton Rovers F.C. players
Association football forwards
Association football defenders
Scottish footballers
Scottish Professional Football League players
Scottish Junior Football Association players